DeKalb–Peachtree Airport  is a county-owned, public-use airport in DeKalb County, Georgia, United States. The airport is located in the city of Chamblee, just northeast of Atlanta. It is also known commonly as Peachtree–DeKalb Airport, or simply PDK. Other names (rarely used) include Peachtree Airport, DeKalb Airport, or DeKalb County Airport. ASOS weather reports are produced 24 hours per day as "Chamblee". It has airline service with Ultimate Air Shuttle to Cincinnati and Southern Airways Express to Memphis and Destin.

As per Federal Aviation Administration records, the airport had 1,784 passenger boardings (enplanements) in calendar year 2008, 393 enplanements in 2009, and 463 in 2010. It is included in the National Plan of Integrated Airport Systems for 2011–2015, which categorized it as a reliever airport.

History 
The property was originally part of Camp Gordon, a World War I military training camp. That facility closed in 1922. In 1940, the United States government authorized construction of a military airport on the former site of the Chamblee camp. The airport began operations on March 22, 1941, a few months before the U.S. entry into World War II, as Naval Air Station Atlanta.

Barracks constructed at the facility during the war became classrooms in late 1948 for Southern Technical Institute, a new engineering technology school created by Georgia Tech for former soldiers. Leased from the county by the United States Navy, the airport was converted from military to civilian use from 1957 to 1959.

Naval Air Station Atlanta subsequently moved to Marietta on the south side of what is now called Dobbins Air Reserve Base. NAS Atlanta was ultimately closed by BRAC action in 2009. Like NAS Atlanta, the Southern Technical Institute moved from PDK in 1958, to land donated by Dobbins, and it now operates as Southern Polytechnic College of Engineering and Engineering Technology, a part of Kennesaw State University.

In 1973, PDK was the site of a Learjet crash, resulting in seven fatalities. It was determined that the crash resulted from "[t]he loss of engine thrust during takeoff due to ingestion of birds by the engines, resulting in loss of control of the airplane." The aircraft struck an apartment building and burned in a complex just south of the airport. Large flocks of birds were attracted to an adjacent DeKalb County landfill (operational in summer 1962 and finally closed in early 1975), which had become a flight safety issue long before the crash, after several minor bird strikes in the late 1960s and early 1970s.

Facilities and aircraft 
Dekalb–Peachtree Airport covers an area of 745 acres (301 ha) at an elevation of 1,003 feet (306 m) above mean sea level. It has three runways: 3R/21L (formerly 2R/20L) is 6,001 by 100 feet (1,829 x 30 m) with a concrete surface; 3L/21R (formerly 2L/20R) is 3,746 by 150 feet (1,142 x 46 m) with an asphalt surface; and 16/34, which is 3,967 by 150 feet (1,209 x 46 m) with an asphalt surface. It also has one helipad designated H1 with a concrete surface measuring 56 by 56 feet (17 x 17 m).

For the 12-month period ending August 31, 2010, the airport had 202,491 aircraft operations, an average of 554 per day: 99.9% general aviation and 0.1% military. At that time there were 447 aircraft based at this airport: 68% single-engine, 17% multi-engine, 11% jet, and 5% helicopter.

The airport has over 100 hangars. It is the second-busiest airport in Georgia, behind Hartsfield–Jackson Atlanta International Airport (ATL), in the number of flight operations per year and is the seventh-busiest general aviation (non-airline) airport in the US. PDK helps to relieve ATL of smaller-aircraft traffic. It is used by helicopters for metro Atlanta's four major network-affiliated television stations (WAGA-TV, WANF, WSB-TV, and WXIA-TV) as the base for electronic news gathering from the air. PDK is also home to The AutoPILOT Magazine, an advertorial publication covering all things aviation-related. Many of the old NAS Atlanta buildings still remain. The largest houses offices for PDK administration, flight schools, and the Civil Air Patrol, as well as the Downwind restaurant, with an aviation-themed decor and an open deck overlooking the active runways. Adjacent to that building is a children's playground, Georgia's first aviation park.

In late 2018, the first EMAS installed in Georgia was added to runway 3R/21L.

Airlines and destinations

Economic impact 

In 1997, DeKalb Peachtree Airport was one of the largest tax contributors of DeKalb County, behind The Southern Company and Bellsouth, but receives no taxpayer dollars for operations. The 1997 study funded by the airport found that in addition to 762 aviation-related jobs at the airport, there may be 3,600 non-airport jobs driven by airport activities like taxi drivers and cleaning personnel.

Accidents
On February 26, 1973, a Learjet crashed trying to return to the airport after suffering a bird strike after takeoff. See 1973 DeKalb–Peachtree Airport Learjet crash.

References

External links 

 DeKalb–Peachtree Airport
 3:58 Video: Pat Epps – Epps Aviation 
 PDK Watch
 Open DeKalb, Inc.
 Aerial image as of April 2002 from USGS The National Map
 
 

Airports in Georgia (U.S. state)
Buildings and structures in DeKalb County, Georgia
Transportation in DeKalb County, Georgia
Chamblee, Georgia